The Greek Internet Exchange (GR-IX) is an Internet exchange point located in Athens and Thessaloniki in Greece. It was founded in 2009 in order to replace the Athens Internet Exchange as the principal Internet Exchange Point in Greece, which was achieved in January 2010. GR-IX is non-profit, independent and is supervised by the Greek Research and Technology Network (GRNET). GR-IX is a member of the European Internet Exchange Association.

History
The predecessor of GR-IX, Athens Internet Exchange (AIX) was created by GRNET in 1997,  to provide interconnection services between the Greek ISPs. By the late 1990s, the way AIX was set up was not completely satisfactory to the member ISPs: since AIX was located in Hellenic Telecommunications Organization (OTE) facilities, providers had to lease lines from OTE in order to connect to AIX. Additionally, ISPs had the right to charge other members for exchanged traffic, a right sometimes overused by the larger providers. To deal with these issues, GRNET decided in 2008 to create a new exchange, GR-IX. GR-IX went operational in 2009 and by January 2010 all AIX members had completed their move to GR-IX.

Members
Some of the member of GR-IX are:
Amazon
Cloudflare
Cyta
Forthnet
Greek Research and Technology Network
Hurricane Electric
Microsoft
OTE
Vodafone
Verizon Communications
WIND Hellas

Network 
GR-IX hold three points of presence in Athens; one is located at 48 King Constantinos Street, at a building owned by the National Hellenic Research Foundation, one at Lamda Hellix's Data Center in Koropi and one at Telecom Italia Sparkle Greece's Data Center in Metamorfosi.

GR-IX has also one point of presence in Thessaloniki, located in SYNAPSECOM's S.A. Data Center in Kalohori.

References

External links
Greek Internet Exchange (official website)
Connected parties
Points of presence
Traffic statistics
Presence in LAMDA HELLIX Data Centers
European Internet Exchange Association entry

2009 establishments in Greece
Internet exchange points in Greece
Internet in Greece